Jolyn Christine Heutmaker (born October 5, 1970), known professionally as Josie Bissett, is an American actress. She is known for her role as Jane Mancini on the television series Melrose Place (1992–1999), and for her television film appearances over the past three decades.

Early life 
A native of Seattle, Washington, Bissett began her career in front of the camera at the age of 12 as a model in print advertisements and television commercials.

Career
Bissett's acting debut was in the 1989 Italian-American produced horror film Hitcher in the Dark. By that time, she had adopted her mother's maiden name as her stage name, after her original surname Heutmaker was found too difficult for agents to pronounce. In early 1990, Bissett played a recurring role on the sitcom The Hogan Family for two seasons. In 1992, she was cast as fashion designer Jane Andrews-Mancini on the prime time soap opera Melrose Place. Bissett remained with the series for five-and-a-half seasons until halfway through the 1996–97 season when she suffered a real-life miscarriage. She then took some time off from the series, but returned to the show in 1998 for its final season. In 2009–10, Bissett made guest appearances in two episodes of The CW's updated version of Melrose Place, reprising her role as Jane Andrews-Mancini.

She has made appearances in such projects as the telefilms The Fire Above and Dare to Love on ABC, Deadly Vows on FOX, Baby Monitor: Sound of Fear on USA, and I Do, They Don't on ABC Family. She has also made numerous guest-starring appearances, such as a 2003 appearance on NBC's Law & Order: Special Victims Unit. In 2008, she began a recurring role on the ABC Family TV series The Secret Life of the American Teenager. She starred in the Lifetime Television original film The Other Woman, based on the novel by Joy Fielding and directed by Jason Priestley. It debuted on June 28, 2008.

Bissett's feature film debut was in 1991, in Oliver Stone's The Doors, as the girlfriend of Doors' guitarist Robby Krieger. Her subsequent films include the coming-of-age comedy Book of Love and the psychological thriller Mikey.

Bissett has hosted television series on the topic of parenting, including Parenting & Beyond, which offered parents creative solutions to everyday problems. She also hosted the PBS educational special Teach More, Love More which follows four families, each with a child in a stage of early childhood development.

She has appeared on several magazine covers, including TV Guide, Rolling Stone, Entertainment Weekly, Shape's Fit Pregnancy and New Woman.

Bissett has been the face of several national commercial campaigns, including Neutrogena's skin care line, Dr. Scholl's Pedicure Essentials, and Murad Skin Care.

She has also been the spokesperson of the 1997 Lee National Denim Day with the Lee Company. This was to help raise money for the fight against breast cancer and for the Susan G. Komen Breast Cancer Foundation.

She has co-edited two books, Little Bits Of Wisdom and Making Memories, which compile parenting stories and advice from parents around the world. She also  authored a children's book, Tickle Monster, released in April 2008.

Personal life
In 1992, Bissett married actor Rob Estes, who also starred on Melrose Place. The couple have two children together. They announced their plans to divorce in January 2006.

Bissett resides in Seattle. She married Thomas Doig on July 4, 2017.

Filmography

Film

Television

References

External links

1970 births
Living people
Actresses from Seattle
American book editors
American children's writers
American film actresses
American soap opera actresses
American television actresses
Writers from Seattle
21st-century American women